Spanish Social Democratic Union (USDE) was a social-liberal political party in Spain that opposed the Francoist State and wanted a liberal democracy in Spain. The USDE was founded in 1974 by Dionisio Ridruejo.

History
It was the successor of the Social Party of Democratic Action founded in 1957. The USDE had social-Catholic, liberal and social-democratic internal currents.

In 1975 the USDE joined the Democratic Convergence Platform. Fernando Chueca Goitia, one of the founders of USDE, left the party in July 1976 to join the People's Democratic Party, where he was elected president in December of that year.

See also
Democratic Convergence Platform
List of political parties in Spain

References

1974 establishments in Spain
1979 disestablishments in Spain
Anti-Francoism
Defunct social democratic parties in Spain
Liberal parties in Spain
Political parties disestablished in 1979
Political parties established in 1974